Frida Broström (born 2 August 1982) is a Swedish footballer defender who plays for Mallbackens IF.

References

External links
 

1982 births
Living people
Swedish women's footballers
Mallbackens IF players
Damallsvenskan players
Women's association football defenders
Elitettan players